= J. W. McDonnell =

American politician

Member of the Washington House of Representatives for the 39th district
- In office 1895–1897

Personal details
- Born: September 16, 1854 Worcester, Massachusetts, United States
- Died: November 11, 1939 (aged 85) Seattle, Washington, United States
- Party: Republican

John W. McDonnell (September 16, 1854 – November 11, 1939) was an American politician in the state of Washington. He served in the Washington House of Representatives from 1895 to 1897.
